Hellinsia devriesi is a moth of the family Pterophoridae. It is found on the Galapagos Islands and Guadeloupe.

The antennae have beige and pale brown scales. The head is brown, but white as a thin row between the antennae. The thorax is yellowish brown anteriorly and paler posteriorly. The forewings are yellowish brown with dark brown markings. The hindwings and their fringes are uniformly greyish brown. Adults have been recorded in November and December.

The larvae feed on Ipomoea setifera, Ipomoea tiliacea and Merremia umbellata.

Etymology 
This species is named after Professor T.J. de Vries of the Pontifícia Universidad Católica del Ecuador in Quito, who collected the type series.

References 

devriesi
Moths described in 1992
Moths of South America
Endemic fauna of the Galápagos Islands
Moths of Guadeloupe